Kanipahu was an ancient Hawaiian chief. He was of the Pili line.

Kanipahu was a son of Aliʻi Kaniuhu and Hiliamakani.

After Kanipahu lived on Molokaʻi and it was discovered that he was a chief, he was taken (as husband) by Hualani, the ruling chiefess of Molokaʻi
. One of the neverforgotten fact of Kanipahuʻs descendants was this marriage. Hualani was the great-granddaughter of Nuakea, who was the granddaughter of Maweke. Beside Hualani, of Molakaʻi and Oʻahu descent above mentioned, he also married his half-aunt, Alaʻikauakoko, who at one time, whether previously or subsequently cannot now be ascertained, was the wife of Lakona of Oahu. With one of them he fathered two sons: Kanaloa—father of Kalapana of Hawaiʻi—and Kalahumoku I, ancestor of Akahiʻakuleʻana.

David Malo said Alaʻikauakoko was the mother of Kalapana, making Kalapana Kanipahu's son instead of grandson. Malo skips this generation, showing Kalapana as the son of Kanipahu.

References

Abraham Fornander, An Account of the Polynesian Race: Its Origin and Migrations, Rutland, VT: Charles E. Tuttle Company, 1969

External links

Royalty of Hawaii (island)
Royalty of Molokai
House of Pili